Brian Roderick Banks (born November 15, 1976) is an American politician who served as a member of the Michigan House of Representatives from 2013 to 2017. Banks was a candidate for the 2nd District of the Michigan Senate in 2018. He has been convicted of eight felonies related to writing bad checks and credit card fraud.

Education
A high school dropout, Banks later received his GED. Banks earned a Bachelor of Science degree and Master of Education from Wayne State University, followed by a Juris Doctor from the Michigan State University College of Law.

Career

Early career 
During his early career, Banks has falsely claimed to be an attorney. The State Bar of Michigan has no record of Banks ever being licensed to practice law in Michigan.

Banks's campaign website previously stated that he was on staff at the law firm Rodnick, Unger and Kaner, P.C. and was an adjunct professor at Baker College. An employee at Rodnick, Unger and Kaner, P.C. told the Huffington Post that while Banks briefly worked at the firm as a law clerk, he left after only a few months.

Banks has also claimed to be an elementary school teacher and his biography on the Michigan House Democrats website listed him as a former elementary school teacher. The Michigan Department of Education Online Educator Certification System states that Banks has never held an Educator Certification.

Michigan House of Representatives 
Despite a number of controversies, Banks defeated Scott Benson by 96 votes to win the 2012 Democratic primary for the 1st district of the Michigan House of Representatives. During the 2012 general election, the Grosse Pointe Democrats refused to endorse Banks.

Although only receiving 42% of the vote in the 2014 primary, Banks was re-elected.

During the August 2016 primary election, Banks defended a challenge for his seat by Harper Woods attorney Pamela Sossi.

Despite Banks's significant fundraising advantage, Sossi led the race throughout the night until last minute votes were reported, giving Banks a narrow victory. Sossi swept the suburbs, winning Harper Woods, Grosse Pointe Woods and Grosse Pointe Shores, while Banks won Detroit. According to the Detroit Free Press, the 1st House District Primary Election was the most competitive election in Wayne County.

As the chair of the Detroit Caucus, Banks was able to enlist the help of Detroit Mayor Mike Duggan, other lawmakers and interest groups in Lansing to raise $140,545, second most of all candidates facing Primary challengers. Records show that Banks major financial backers included Republican "Matty" Moroun (owner of the Detroit International Bridge Co.), State Rep. Andy Schor, Reynolds American, Rizzo Environmental Services and Gaspar Fiore. Rizzo Environmental and Fiore would later be ensnared in a public corruption investigation by the FBI.

During the November 8 general election, Banks received 66 percent of the vote over engineer William Broman, his Republican challenger.

Resignation
On February 6, 2017, just 26 days into his third term in the Michigan House of Representatives, Banks resigned his seat to avoid prison time. Banks's resignation letter, submitted to House Speaker Tom Leonard, was effective immediately. In a statement, Speaker Leonard said, “Rep. Banks had one legal issue after another during his time in public office. I am glad to see he is finally taking responsibility for his actions, and hopefully today's plea agreement provides the fresh start he needs."

By 9 am, February 8, 2017, Banks was sending e-mails to supporters inviting them to a March 6 fundraiser for his PAC, Bank on Banks for Michigan, leading to speculation that he would be running for future office, or financially backing his chosen successor. The fundraiser was held at Sinbad's restaurant in Detroit, and advertised tickets starting at $50 and topping out at $5,000 for a platinum sponsorship.

On February 16, 2017, Governor Rick Snyder called a Special Election to fill the vacancy left by Banks's resignation. Both the Governor and the Secretary of State's office ruled that Banks was not eligible to run for his own seat, ending speculation that he might do so. Additionally, Representative Aaron Miller filed HB 4208 to ensure that expelled or resigned former members could not run in the special election called because of the vacancy they caused.

2018 Michigan Senate election
In August 2017, Banks filed candidate paperwork to run for the Michigan State Senate 2nd District seat in anticipation of a resignation by Bert Johnson, who has been federally indicted for corruption. According to the invitation obtained by the Detroit News, Banks kicked off his campaign with a November 13 fundraiser at the American Serbian Hall in Detroit. Suggested contributions ranged from $41 for a ticket to $2,000 for a sponsor-level donor.

Banks's attempt to return to the Michigan Legislature failed. In the August 7, 2018 Election, Banks lost to first-time candidates Adam Hollier of Detroit (25.1%) and Abraham Aiyash of Hamtramck (20.9%).

2022 Wayne County Commission election
In 2022 Banks ran in the August Democratic primary to represent District 1 on the Wayne County Commission, listing his address as a post office box in Grosse Pointe. Incumbent Commissioner Tim Killeen defeated Banks in the primary election by 61.6% to 38.1%.

Business 
In 2019 Banks pitched his consulting services to the Detroit Public Schools Community District (DPSCD) and Promise Schools, a company running a K-8 school for the School District of the City of Highland Park. Promise Schools initially contracted with Banks, after receiving a "strong recommendation, on more than one occasion" from District President Alexis Ramsey. Ramsey admitted that she was a political ally of Banks, but insisted that she did not push the District to hire Banks. Promise Schools CEO Melissa Hamann stated that Ramsey's recommendation was influential in the decision to hire Banks.

After being contacted by a concerned citizen about the hire, Highland Park School Board member Eban Morales told Fox 2 Detroit: "I contacted Promise Schools and I said to them, like, 'How did he come about?' And the head person there said: 'Alexis Ramsey strongly suggested on more than one occasion that we needed to hire him.' And I'm like: 'Do you know his history?' And they're like, 'Yeah, well, she said that we should hire him and that he was the best person for the job.'"

Unlike Promise Schools, DPSCD officials asked Banks to submit a bid for the work he proposed. During negotiations, Banks's bid was the lowest bid received by the District. However, according to Assistant Superintendent Chrystal Wilson, when “the District proceeded to its contract due diligence phase...more detailed information regarding Mr. Banks's background was realized that made it untenable for the district to move forward with a formal contract. Since that time, the District has not engaged in business with Mr. Banks and at this point does not intend to.”

Criminal and civil history
Since 1998 Banks has been convicted of eight felonies for writing bad checks and credit card fraud, and one misdemeanor.

Civil judgements
Since his first election, Banks has civil judgements against him in the amount of $47,809.84. He has been evicted a total of seven times in recent years, including two eviction proceedings filed against him in 2016.

During the 2012 election, Banks refused to pay Sawicki & Sons, the company that made his campaign signs.

During the 2012 Primary Election, Banks was evicted from a home in Harper Woods at 19239 Berden by landlord Michele Wood, who took him to court three times for writing bad checks and not paying rent.

After the 2012 General Election, Banks was evicted from his Harper Woods home at 20927 Fleetwood when he bounced two checks to landlord Dan Sylvester.

Sexual harassment
In 2013 Banks was sued for sexual harassment by his Legislative Aide, Mr. Tramaine Cotton. According to Tim Bowlin, director of the House Business Office, the state paid $85,622 to the Dickinson Wright law firm to defend Banks against the charges of sexual harassment. The lawsuit was later settled for $11,950.

Fraud
On June 28, 2016, Banks was charged with three new felonies and one misdemeanor by Michigan Attorney General Bill Schuette over documents he falsified, to obtain a personal loan in June 2010. In a press release, the Attorney General's office said the felony charges against Banks stemmed from his use of falsified pay stubs in an application for a $7,500 loan. The news release stated that Banks claimed to work for IHI Attorneys and Consultants of Farmington, but investigators learned he had never worked there, and the paychecks “originated with a payroll company the firm never used.” Because of his previous felony convictions, Banks was charged as a habitual offender and could have faced life in prison if convicted of the new felonies.

In August 2016 Banks was bound over to Wayne County Circuit Court for trial on all charges by District Court Judge Deborah Langston. Banks was formally arraigned in Circuit Court on August 23.

On February 6, 2017, Banks pleaded guilty to a misdemeanor charge of filing false financial statements, a charge that carried a penalty of up to a year in prison. As part of a plea deal Banks reached with the Michigan Attorney General's office, the remaining felony charges he was facing were dropped.

Sentencing on the plea deal was set for 9 a.m. on February 17, 2017. Banks was sentenced to time served. He previously spent one day in jail. In a statement following Banks's sentencing, Michigan Attorney General Bill Schuette stated, "Former Rep. Banks pleaded guilty, admitting he did indeed commit the crime for which he was sentenced. I am pleased to see this case come to a close and that the residents of his district have the chance to get an honest, hardworking and law-abiding representative."

Mail fraud
In July 2016 Kevin Trayer, the Postmaster of the Richland Post Office, investigated Banks for mail fraud, concerning mail pieces that listed defunct Political Action Committees (PACs) in the required political disclaimer. The pieces attacked Banks's Primary opponent Pamela Sossi and echoed claims Banks had made while knocking doors. The former legislators tied to the dissolved PACs had no ties to Banks and denied allowing him to use the PACs for any purpose.

Violation of Michigan Campaign Finance Act
On September 15, 2016, Michigan Secretary of State Ruth Johnson ruled that Banks used House funds or resources to mail invitations to an event advocating for his re-election, a violation of section 57 of the Michigan Campaign Finance Act. As a result, Banks was required to personally reimburse the Michigan House of Representatives for the materials and labor misused.

In December 2016 Banks filed a motion to have Michigan Attorney General Bill Schuette's office disqualified from the case, again claiming that the charges brought against him were politically motivated collusion between Pamela Sossi and the Attorney General, timed to ensure Banks lost his bid for re-election. Wayne County Circuit Judge Michael Hathaway dismissed Banks motion, ruling that the key question was not why Banks may have been charged, but whether he committed the crimes alleged in the charges.

In February 2017 Banks reached a plea agreement with the Attorney General's office in which all felony counts against were dropped in exchange for his immediate resignation from the Michigan House of Representatives and pleading guilty to one misdemeanor. Banks announced his formal resignation in Wayne County Circuit Court on February 6, 2017.

FBI corruption and bribery investigation

In December 2017 the Detroit Free Press obtained FBI wiretap transcripts that were unsealed in U.S. District Court. The investigation is linked to a corruption case against Gasper Fiore, the owner of Boulevard & Trumbull Towing, a large City of Detroit contractor. In December 2017 Fiore entered into a plea agreement with the U.S. Attorney's Office, in which he agreed to plead guilty to conspiracy to commit federal program bribery. According to court documents, the government had probable cause that Fiore and 17 other targets were involved in several crimes, including: extortion, wire fraud, bribery and conspiracy to distribute marijuana.

Fiore was so politically connected that in 2016 his daughter helped write an amendment to the Michigan Department of Transportation (MDOT) budget that ensured his company would win a multimillion-dollar contract, federal documents show. Along the way, Fiore appeared to have gotten help from Banks. "Fiore is involved in bid-rigging with legislator Banks," Special FBI Agent Robert Beeckman wrote in 2016 affidavit, which included intercepted text messages and phone calls between Fiore and Banks.

According to the affidavit, in a May 5, 2016, phone conversation, Fiore and Banks spoke about the MDOT contract when Banks mentioned Fiore's political "might." "MDOT said you have a mighty force behind you ... They said: 'We don't want to mess with that force,' " Banks said. Fiore responded: "Mmmmmm yeah. Does that mean, So what they doing with the deal then?" Banks: "So, you good so far. You hear me." On May 26, a phone call between Gasper Fiore and Banks again discussed the MDOT contract. "MDOT said you have a mighty force behind you," Banks stated. Fiore laughed in response. "They said you – 'We, we don't want to mess with that force behind you.'" Later in the conversation, Banks again reassures Fiore: "You know with the MDOT, you good."

The conversation between Banks and Fiore was among many that the government obtained after bugging Fiore's phone.

Electoral history

See also
Michigan House of Representatives
Michigan Democratic Party

External links

Campaign Finance
Voting Records

References 

1976 births
Living people
21st-century American politicians
Politicians from Detroit
African-American state legislators in Michigan
Democratic Party members of the Michigan House of Representatives
Michigan politicians convicted of crimes
Wayne State University alumni
Michigan State University College of Law alumni
American campaign managers
American political consultants
21st-century African-American politicians
20th-century African-American people